Sándor Szabó (January 4, 1906 – October 16, 1966) was a Hungarian-born professional wrestler who emigrated to America.

At first, due to his large size, he was promoted by Jack Pfefer and Jack Curley of New York City as a "freak talent", one of a number of foreign and extraordinary wrestlers booked to attract the curious. In the early 1940s, Szabo held three world championships. In the 1950s, he was quite popular in Southern California, where he was assistant booker to Jules Strongbow, and held tag team championships in Los Angeles and San Francisco. He also sang a song during the 1950s for Hammerlock Records called "Hold Me in Your Arms". He wrestled his last match in 1963. In 2000, he was inducted into the Wrestling Observer Newsletter Hall of Fame. He died of a heart attack at the age of 60.

Championships and accomplishments
50th State Big Time Wrestling
NWA Hawaii Heavyweight Championship (2 times)
American Wrestling Association
AWA World Heavyweight Championship (1 time)
 California State Athletic Commission
 World Heavyweight Championship (Los Angeles version) (1 time)
Montreal Athletic Commission
World Heavyweight Championship (Montreal version) (1 time)
NWA Hollywood Wrestling
NWA "Beat the Champ" Television Championship (8 times)
WWA International Television Tag Team Championship (7 times) - with Wilbur Snyder (2), Bobo Brazil (1), Gene Stanlee (1), Billy Darnell (1) and Edouard Carpentier (2)
NWA World Tag Team Championship (Los Angeles version) (1 time) - with Billy Darnell
NWA San Francisco
NWA World Tag Team Championship (San Francisco version) (2 times) - with Primo Carnera (1) and Ron Etchison (1)
National Wrestling Association
NWA World Heavyweight Championship (1 time)
Professional Wrestling Hall of Fame and Museum
Class of 2013
Wrestling Observer Newsletter awards
Wrestling Observer Newsletter Hall of Fame (Class of 2000)

References

External links
 

Hungarian professional wrestlers
1966 deaths
1906 births
Place of birth missing
Burials at Woodlawn Memorial Cemetery, Santa Monica
Professional Wrestling Hall of Fame and Museum
Hungarian emigrants to the United States
20th-century professional wrestlers
NWA "Beat the Champ" Television Champions